The meridian 62° west of Greenwich is a line of longitude that extends from the North Pole across the Arctic Ocean, Greenland, North America, the Atlantic Ocean, South America, the Southern Ocean, and Antarctica to the South Pole.

The 62nd meridian west forms a great circle with the 118th meridian east.

From Pole to Pole
Starting at the North Pole and heading south to the South Pole, the 62nd meridian west passes through:

{| class="wikitable plainrowheaders"
! scope="col" width="120" | Co-ordinates
! scope="col" | Country, territory or sea
! scope="col" | Notes
|-
| style="background:#b0e0e6;" | 
! scope="row" style="background:#b0e0e6;" | Arctic Ocean
| style="background:#b0e0e6;" |
|-
| style="background:#b0e0e6;" | 
! scope="row" style="background:#b0e0e6;" | Lincoln Sea
| style="background:#b0e0e6;" |
|-
| 
! scope="row" | 
| Nunavut — Ellesmere Island
|-
| style="background:#b0e0e6;" | 
! scope="row" style="background:#b0e0e6;" | Nares Strait
| style="background:#b0e0e6;" |
|-
| 
! scope="row" | 
|Daugaard-Jensen Land
|-
| style="background:#b0e0e6;" | 
! scope="row" style="background:#b0e0e6;" | Baffin Bay
| style="background:#b0e0e6;" |
|-
| style="background:#b0e0e6;" | 
! scope="row" style="background:#b0e0e6;" | Davis Strait
| style="background:#b0e0e6;" |
|-
| 
! scope="row" | 
| Nunavut — Baffin Island
|-
| style="background:#b0e0e6;" | 
! scope="row" style="background:#b0e0e6;" | Davis Strait
| style="background:#b0e0e6;" | Exeter Sound
|-
| 
! scope="row" | 
| Nunavut — Baffin Island
|-
| style="background:#b0e0e6;" | 
! scope="row" style="background:#b0e0e6;" | Davis Strait
| style="background:#b0e0e6;" | Passing just east of Angijak Island, Nunavut,  (at )
|-
| style="background:#b0e0e6;" | 
! scope="row" style="background:#b0e0e6;" | Atlantic Ocean
| style="background:#b0e0e6;" | Labrador Sea
|-valign="top"
| 
! scope="row" | 
| Newfoundland and Labrador — Labrador Quebec — from 
|-
| style="background:#b0e0e6;" | 
! scope="row" style="background:#b0e0e6;" | Gulf of Saint Lawrence
| style="background:#b0e0e6;" | Jacques Cartier Strait
|-
| 
! scope="row" | 
| Quebec — Anticosti Island
|-
| style="background:#b0e0e6;" | 
! scope="row" style="background:#b0e0e6;" | Gulf of Saint Lawrence
| style="background:#b0e0e6;" |
|-
| 
! scope="row" | 
| Quebec — Magdalen Islands
|-
| style="background:#b0e0e6;" | 
! scope="row" style="background:#b0e0e6;" | Gulf of Saint Lawrence
| style="background:#b0e0e6;" |
|-
| 
! scope="row" | 
| Prince Edward Island — easternmost tip
|-
| style="background:#b0e0e6;" | 
! scope="row" style="background:#b0e0e6;" | Gulf of Saint Lawrence
| style="background:#b0e0e6;" | Northumberland Strait
|-
| 
! scope="row" | 
| Nova Scotia
|-
| style="background:#b0e0e6;" | 
! scope="row" style="background:#b0e0e6;" | Atlantic Ocean
| style="background:#b0e0e6;" | 
|-valign="top"
| style="background:#b0e0e6;" | 
! scope="row" style="background:#b0e0e6;" | Caribbean Sea
|-
| 
! scope="row" | 
| Paria Peninsula
|-valign="top"
| style="background:#b0e0e6;" | 
! scope="row" style="background:#b0e0e6;" | Gulf of Paria
| style="background:#b0e0e6;" | Passing just west of the island of Trinidad,  (at )
|-
| 
! scope="row" | 
|
|-valign="top"
| 
! scope="row" | 
| Roraima Amazonas — from  Rondônia — from 
|-
| 
! scope="row" | 
|
|-
| 
! scope="row" | 
|
|-
| 
! scope="row" | 
| Mainland, Isla Bermejo and Isla Trinidad
|-
| style="background:#b0e0e6;" | 
! scope="row" style="background:#b0e0e6;" | Atlantic Ocean
| style="background:#b0e0e6;" |
|-
| style="background:#b0e0e6;" | 
! scope="row" style="background:#b0e0e6;" | Southern Ocean
| style="background:#b0e0e6;" |
|-valign="top"
| 
! scope="row" | South Shetland Islands
|-
| style="background:#b0e0e6;" | 
! scope="row" style="background:#b0e0e6;" | Southern Ocean
| style="background:#b0e0e6;" |
|-valign="top"
| 
! scope="row" | Antarctica
|-
| style="background:#b0e0e6;" | 
! scope="row" style="background:#b0e0e6;" | Southern Ocean
| style="background:#b0e0e6;" |
|-valign="top"
| 
! scope="row" | Antarctica
|-
|}

See also
61st meridian west
63rd meridian west

w062 meridian west